Charles Goodan is an American, Los Angeles–based, Grammy Award winning musician, record producer, composer, singer, songwriter, engineer and multi-instrumentalist who has worked with many acclaimed artists such as Beck, The Rolling Stones, David Fincher, Morphine and Linkin Park.  He is best known for his Grammy Award winning work on Santana's album Supernatural, as well composing the Brit-Award nominated score for the film Fight Club and engineering the #1 Billboard song  "MMMBop" by Hanson.

Education
Charles was classically trained in music from the age of four. He earned honors at the Royal Academy of Music in London before majoring in Music, Science & Technology at Stanford University.  While there, Charles was also selected to be the school's unofficial mascot, the Stanford Tree.

Career
He moved to Los Angeles in 1996 to become a staff producer for famed producers The Dust Brothers.  He started his own production company Devil's Food and has gone on to produce and engineer for many other artists and continues to write and compose music for films, television and advertisements through his production company.

References

External links

Discogs
Allmusic.com
Albumcredits.com

American singer-songwriters
American male singer-songwriters
American male composers
21st-century American composers
Stanford University alumni
Living people
American multi-instrumentalists
Grammy Award winners
21st-century American male musicians
Year of birth missing (living people)